The DNA Will Have Its Say is an EP by Some Girls. Karen O also appears on some songs.

Track listing

References

Some Girls (California band) albums
2005 EPs